The Learned Society of Wales is a learned society and charity that exists to "celebrate, recognise, preserve, protect and encourage excellence in all of the scholarly disciplines", and to serve the Welsh nation.

The Learned Society of Wales is Wales's first and only all-embracing national scholarly academy.  A registered charity, it was established and launched on 25 May 2010 at the National Museum of Wales and was granted a Royal Charter in 2015. The society is based in Cardiff.

It is an independent, self-governing, pan-disciplinary, bilingual organisation operating throughout Wales.

Purpose 

The Society describes its mission as to:
 Celebrate, recognise, preserve, protect, and encourage excellence in all scholarly disciplines, and in the professions, industry and commerce, the arts and public service.
 Promote the advancement of learning, scholarship, and the dissemination and application of the results of academic enquiry and research.
 Act as an independent source of expert scholarly advice and comment on matters affecting the research, scholarship and well-being of Wales and its people, and to advance public discussion and interaction on matters of national and international importance.

History 
The Learned Society of Wales was established in 2010 (more than 225 years after the establishment of the Royal Society of Edinburgh, for example, and nearly 350 years after the establishment of the Royal Society in London). The creation of a national academy of learning was a subject of interest and discussion in Wales for some years before then but the idea was taken forward practically only in 2008, when a group of some twenty independent scholars representing the major academic disciplines came together to address  the lack of a learned academy in Wales. They formed themselves into a Shadow Council for what they decided should become the Learned Society of Wales and identified further eminent scholars (almost all of them Fellows of the Royal Society or of the British Academy) who, along with the original group, became the society's sixty Founding Fellows.

In February 2010, Sir John Cadogan was elected to serve as the Society's Inaugural President and Chair of Council and, on 18 May 2010, having operated in shadow form for some months before then, the Learned Society of Wales was incorporated as a company limited by guarantee. One week later, on 25 May 2010, the Society was formally launched during ceremony held at the National Museum in Cardiff.

The University of Wales played a pivotal role in founding the Learned Society of Wales, generously providing a grant, office space and other significant infrastructure facilities at the outset, and its support since then has been instrumental in ensuring the Society's success and growth. Other Welsh universities soon joined the University of Wales in supporting the society and, since 2015/17, all of the country's universities have been providing financial support. Their grants are treated as contributions towards the core costs of the society and as part of its unrestricted funds, thereby ensuring the Society remains fully independent. In 2015/16, grants from the universities comprised nearly three-quarters (£217,000) of the Society's income.

Fellowship 

The Learned Society of Wales has over 500 Fellows, distinguished men and women from all branches of learning.

Election to fellowship is a public recognition of academic excellence.

The Society harnesses the expertise of the Fellowship to help promote awareness of how the sciences and the arts, humanities and social sciences benefit society. Fellows assist the Society in its work by serving on its various committees and working groups and by representing us nationally and internationally.

Fellowship of the Society is open to Welsh residents, those born in Wales or with a particular connection to Wales, who have a "demonstrable record of excellence and achievement" in academia, or who have made a distinguished contribution to knowledge in their professional field.

Fellows of the Learned Society of Wales are entitled to refer to themselves as such and use the initials FLSW after their name.

Fellows are elected following a rigorous process of peer review . Nominations are proposed, and seconded, by existing Fellows of the Society.  The nomination papers of each candidate are then considered by the relevant Scrutiny Committee, prior to further consideration by the Council and submission to the Fellowship as a whole for confirmation and formal election.

Scrutiny Committees, made up of Fellows, operate in the following areas:
 Medicine and Medical Sciences
 Cellular, Molecular, Evolutionary, Organismal and Ecosystem Sciences
 Chemistry, Physics, Astronomy and Earth Sciences
 Computing, Mathematics and Statistics
 Engineering
 Language, Literature and the history and theory of the Creative and Performing Arts
 History, Philosophy and Theology
 Economic and Social Sciences, Education and Law
 General
Elections have been held each year since the Inaugural Election of Fellows in 2011, when 119 new Fellows joined the Society's ranks, and, as of 2019, the Society has more than 500 Fellows .

The Fellows are all prominent figures who represent a high level of international expertise and knowledge within their respective academic disciplines and professions.  The Fellowship includes some of Wales's leading scholars, many of whom are also Fellows of other UK learned societies, including the Royal Society, the British Academy, the Academy of Medical Sciences, the Royal Academy of Engineering, the Academy of Social Sciences, the Institute of Physics, the Royal Society of Chemistry, and the Royal Historical Society.  Two of the Fellows are Nobel Laureates.

Presidents
 2010–14 Sir John Cadogan
 2014–2020 Sir Emyr Jones Parry
2020-present Professor Hywel Thomas

Fellows 
Past Fellows include:
John Davies
R. Geraint Gruffydd
Noel Lloyd, CBE
Meic Stephens
Gwyn Thomas
Howard Thomas

Current Fellows include:
Barbara Adam
Catherine Barnard
Deirdre Beddoe
Kirsti Bohata
David Crystal
Menna Elfyn
Ilora Finlay, Baroness Finlay of Llandaff
Andrew Green
Mererid Hopwood
Medwin Hughes
Ronald Hutton
Rhiannon Ifans
 Sir Simon Jenkins
Ann John
Ruth King
Geraint F. Lewis
Gwyneth Lewis
David Lloyd Jones, Lord Lloyd-Jones
John Loughlin
Peredur Lynch
Laura McAllister
Kenneth O. Morgan
Dame Elan Closs Stephens 
Dame Helen Stokes-Lampard 
Meena Upadhyaya
Alasdair Whittle
Rowan Williams, Baron Williams

References

External links
 Learned Society of Wales website

 
2010 establishments in Wales

Organizations established in 2010
Organisations based in Cardiff
Professional associations based in Wales